This is a list of films which placed number one at the weekend box office in Ecuador for the year 2014.

References

 

2014
2014 in Ecuador
Ecuador